Ceratosebacina is a genus of fungi in the order  Auriculariales. The genus, which includes three species found in Europe, was circumscribed in 1993.

References

External links

Auriculariales
Agaricomycetes genera